Shaun Carl Micheel (born January 5, 1969) is an American professional golfer who is best known for his surprise victory at the 2003 PGA Championship.

Career
Micheel was born in Orlando, Florida. He attended Christian Brothers High School in Memphis, Tennessee and Indiana University and turned professional in 1992. He taught himself how to play golf after his parents bought a home on a golf course in Memphis. He had a very patchy early career, during which he struggled to hold on to membership on the PGA Tour. His successes included a victory in the Singapore Open in 1998 and a win on the Nike Tour (now the Korn Ferry Tour) in 1999.

He went into the 2003 PGA Championship at Oak Hill Country Club ranked 169th in the Official World Golf Ranking and making his 164th PGA Tour start, becoming one of the biggest underdogs to win a major in recent times. In the first two rounds, he shot 69-68 (−3) to take a two-shot lead over Billy Andrade and Mike Weir. A third round 69 put him at −4, tied for the lead with Chad Campbell and three shots clear of Weir. He shot a par 70 in the final round to defeat Campbell by two strokes. That season, he finished 32nd on the money list. In 2004, he made the top 100 on the PGA Tour money list for the second time in his career, but he did not make the move up to being a regular high finisher. His career high world ranking is 34th, achieved in 2004.

In August 2006, Micheel returned to prominence when he finished runner-up to Tiger Woods at the PGA Championship at Medinah Country Club; he followed that with T7 two weeks later at the Deutsche Bank Championship. He was also runner-up at the 2006 HSBC World Match Play Championship, after defeating Woods in the first round. On the PGA Tour, he ended the year with nine consecutive cuts and placed in the top 50 on the money list.

Micheel is only the second golfer to make a double eagle (albatross) in U.S. Open history. It came on the 6th hole during the final round of the 2010 U.S. Open.

Micheel is one of the few golfers to have a major as his only PGA Tour win. Micheel has 397 starts through the end of the 2018–19 season, the most of any golfer whose only win was a major. He last played a full season in 2011, competing in the PGA Championship and other events through past champion status.

Micheel began playing the PGA Tour Champions in 2019.

Medical issues
In April 2005, after experiencing months of fatigue, mood changes, and poor play, Micheel began treatment for low testosterone ("Low T", or hypogonadism). He claimed that his testosterone levels had declined to those of "a man in his mid-70s." After beginning treatment, his testosterone levels returned to normal, and he reported that his drive and energy had also returned. His condition was widely publicized during the coverage of the 2006 PGA Championship. On April 18, 2014, after having coped with inability to exercise without being short of breath, Micheel underwent heart surgery and had four stents inserted.

Professional wins (3)

PGA Tour wins (1)

Asian Tour wins (1)

Nike Tour wins (1)

Playoff record
Other playoff record (0–1)

Major championships

Wins (1)

Results timeline
Results not in chronological order in 2020.

CUT = missed the half-way cut
"T" indicates a tie for a place
NT = No tournament due to COVID-19 pandemic

Summary

Most consecutive cuts made – 6 (2001 U.S. Open – 2004 PGA)
Longest streak of top-10s – 1 (twice)

Results in The Players Championship

CUT = missed the halfway cut
"T" indicates a tie for a place

Results in World Golf Championships

QF, R16, R32, R64 = Round in which player lost in match play
"T" = tied

Results in senior major championships

"T" indicates a tie for a place
CUT = missed the halfway cut
NT = No tournament due to COVID-19 pandemic

See also
1993 PGA Tour Qualifying School graduates
1996 PGA Tour Qualifying School graduates
1999 Nike Tour graduates
2001 PGA Tour Qualifying School graduates
List of men's major championships winning golfers

References

External links

American male golfers
Indiana Hoosiers men's golfers
PGA Tour golfers
PGA Tour Champions golfers
Winners of men's major golf championships
Korn Ferry Tour graduates
Golfers from Orlando, Florida
Golfers from Memphis, Tennessee
1969 births
Living people